Jaap Stenger (4 July 1907 – 16 May 1992) was a Dutch rower. He competed in the men's eight event at the 1928 Summer Olympics.

References

1907 births
1992 deaths
Dutch male rowers
Olympic rowers of the Netherlands
Rowers at the 1928 Summer Olympics
Sportspeople from Delft